Functional finance is an economic theory proposed by Abba P. Lerner, based on effective demand principles and chartalism. It states that government should finance itself to meet explicit goals, such as taming the business cycle, achieving full employment, ensuring growth, and low inflation.

Principles 
The principal ideas behind functional finance can be summarized as:

Governments have to intervene in the national and global economy; these economies are not self-regulating.
The principal economic objective of the state should be to ensure a prosperous economy.
Money is a creature of the state; it has to be managed.
Fiscal policy should be directed in light of its impact on the economy, and the budget should be managed accordingly, that is, 'balancing revenue and spending' is not important; prosperity is important.
The amount and pace of government spending should be set in light of the desired level of activity, and taxes should be levied for their economic impact, rather than to raise revenue.
Principles of 'sound finance' apply to individuals. They make sense for individuals, households, businesses, and non-sovereign governments (such as cities and individual US states) but do not apply to the governments of sovereign states, capable of issuing money.

Rules for fiscal policy 
Lerner postulated that government's fiscal policy should be governed by three rules:

 The government shall maintain a reasonable level of demand at all times. If there is too little spending and, thus, excessive unemployment, the government shall reduce taxes or increase its own spending. If there is too much spending, the government shall prevent inflation by reducing its own expenditures or by increasing taxes.
 By borrowing money when it wishes to raise the rate of interest and by lending money or repaying debt when it wishes to lower the rate of interest, the government shall maintain that rate of interest that induces the optimum amount of investment.
 If either of the first two rules conflicts with principles of 'sound finance' or of balancing the budget, or of limiting the national debt, so much the worse for these principles. The government press shall print any money that may be needed to carry out rules 1 and 2.

See also
Government success
Government failure
Market failure
Modern Monetary Theory

Notes

References

External links 
Functional Finance: What, Why, and How? - a case for functional finance in most of the developed world (1999)
Lerner, Abba: Functional Finance and the Federal Debt (1943)

Public economics
Unemployment
Keynesian economics